Goniomma is a genus of ants in the subfamily Myrmicinae.

Species
Goniomma baeticum Reyes, Espadaler & Rodriguez, 1987
Goniomma blanci (André, 1881)
Goniomma collingwoodi Espadaler, 1997
Goniomma compressisquama Tinaut, Ruano, Hidalgo & Ballesta, 1995
Goniomma decipiens Espadaler, 1997
Goniomma hispanicum (André, 1883)
Goniomma kugleri Espadaler, 1986
Goniomma punicum (Forel, 1907)

References

External links

Myrmicinae
Ant genera